John Miller Carson Jr. (June 26, 1864 – January 18, 1956) was a brigadier general in the United States Army during World War I.

Early life and education 
John Miller Carson was born on June 26, 1864, in Philadelphia, Pennsylvania.  He attended the United States Military Academy and graduated in the class of 1885.

Early military service 
Carson served on frontier duty at Fort Reno.  This was followed by an assignment as the Assistant to the Quartermaster of the Department of Missouri until August 1890.

Awards 
Carson received the Army Distinguished Service Medal for his service during World War I.

Death and legacy 
Carson died on January 18, 1956, in Fort Jackson, South Carolina.

References 

United States Army generals
1864 births
1956 deaths
Military personnel from Philadelphia
United States Military Academy alumni
Recipients of the Distinguished Service Medal (US Army)
United States Army generals of World War I